The 1963 Bluebonnet Bowl was a college football postseason bowl game between the Baylor Bears of the Southwest Conference and the LSU Tigers of the SEC. Baylor won the game, 14–7.

Baylor entered the game with a 7–3 overall record and 6-1 conference record. The team was led by head coach John Bridgers. LSU entered the game with a 7-3 overall record and 4-2 conference record. The team was led by head coach Charles McClendon.

Game summary
Baylor defeated LSU 14–7.

References

Bluebonnet Bowl
Bluebonnet Bowl
Baylor Bears football bowl games
LSU Tigers football bowl games
December 1963 sports events in the United States
Bluebonnet Bowl